The 2016 V8 Supercar season was the twentieth and final season in which V8 Supercars have contested the premier Australian touring car series. It was the 57th season of touring car racing in Australia since the first runnings of the Australian Touring Car Championship, now known as the International V8 Supercars Championship, and the fore-runner of the present day Bathurst 1000, the Armstrong 500.

The season began on 3 March at the Adelaide Street Circuit and finished on 27 November at the Homebush Street Circuit. 2016 featured the twentieth V8 Supercar Championship, consisting of 29 races at 14 events covering all six states and the Northern Territory of Australia as well an event in New Zealand. Originally the Supercars were going to make their first trip to Kuala Lumpur, but the event had to be cancelled due to certain logistical failures on the part of the promoters in Malaysia. There was also a stand-alone event supporting the 2016 Australian Grand Prix. The season also featured the seventeenth second-tier Dunlop V8 Supercar Series, contested over seven rounds. For the ninth time, de-registered Supercars contested an unofficial third-tier series, the Kumho Tyre V8 Touring Car Series.

Race calendar
The following events were held during the season.

IVC – International V8 Supercars Championship
DVS – V8 Supercars Dunlop Series
KVTC – Kumho Tyres Australian V8 Touring Car Series
NC – Non-championship

International V8 Supercars Championship

Dunlop V8 Supercar Series

Kumho Tyres Australian V8 Touring Car Series

Coates Hire V8 Supercars Challenge

References

External links
 
 

Supercar seasons